Allgemeine Sparkasse Oberosterreich is a bank based in Austria. Its head office is situated at Linz, Upper Austria.

In August 2015, the bank acted as one of the lead managers in the $613.5 million loan securing by the Türk Ekonomi Bankası in an international syndicate of 32 more banks.

See also

List of banks
List of banks in Austria

References

External links

Banks of Austria
Companies based in Linz
Economy of Upper Austria